is a Japanese male  BMX rider, representing his nation at international competitions. He competed in the time trial event at the 2015 UCI BMX World Championships.

References

External links
 
 
 
 

1993 births
Living people
BMX riders
Japanese male cyclists
Olympic cyclists of Japan
Cyclists at the 2010 Summer Youth Olympics
Cyclists at the 2016 Summer Olympics
Cyclists at the 2020 Summer Olympics
Asian Games gold medalists for Japan
Asian Games medalists in cycling
Cyclists at the 2018 Asian Games
Medalists at the 2018 Asian Games
Place of birth missing (living people)
20th-century Japanese people
21st-century Japanese people